Anders Järryd and Hans Simonsson were the defending champions, but lost in the final to Joakim Nyström and Mats Wilander. The final score was 1–6, 7–6(7–4), 7–6(7–4)

Seeds

Draw

Draw

References

External links
 Official results archive (WTA)
 Official results archive (ITF)

Men's Doubles
Doubles